Millersburg Historic District may refer to:

Millersburg Historic District (Millersburg, Kentucky), listed on the National Register of Historic Places in Bourbon County, Kentucky
Millersburg Historic District (Millersburg, Ohio), listed on the National Register of Historic Places in Holmes County, Ohio